Levi Swanton Gould  (March 27, 1831 – March 22, 1917) was an American businessman and politician who served as a member, and chairman of the Middlesex County, Massachusetts county commission, and as the first mayor of Melrose, Massachusetts.

Early life and education 

Gould was born to Dr. Levi Gould and Elizabeth Webb (Whitmore) Gould in Dixmont, Maine on March 27, 1831.  When he was six months old his family moved to his father's home town of Stoneham, Massachusetts. His next three siblings were born in Wilmington, Massachusetts between 1838 and 1845, after which his family moved to the Town of North Malden, (now the City of Melrose, Massachusetts).  Gould was educated in the public schools of North Malden and at Waitt's and Ingalls' academies in Melrose.

Family life 
Gould married Mary Eliza Payne the daughter of Samuel and Mary (Vose) Payne on February 23, 1860.  They had two children, Mary Pearl Gould, born on  September 5, 1862,  and Annie Elizabeth Gould, born April 30, 1866.

Business career 
In 1866 Gould became connected with the F. M. Holmes & Company. F. M. Holmes & Company, was a business that manufactured and sold furniture.   1878 Gould purchased F. M. Holmes and Company and ran it as the F. M. Holmes Furniture Company. The F. M. Holmes Furniture Company factory was in Charlestown, and its warehouse and salesroom was in Boston.

Death 
Gould died in Melrose on March 22, 1917.

See also
 1868 Massachusetts legislature

End notes

Further reading

 Cutter, William Richard: Historic Homes & Places and Genealogical & Personal Memoirs Relating to the Families of Middlesex County Massachusetts, Pages 1410–1411, (1908).
Gould, Levi S.: Ancient Middlesex with Brief Biographical Sketches of the Men Who Have Served the County Since its Settlement.  Somerville Journal Print:  Somerville, Mass., (1905).
 Mason, Edward P.: Massachusetts of To-day: A Memorial of the State, Historical and Biographical, Issued for the World's Columbian Exposition at Chicago. Columbia Publishing Company, Pg. 599, (1892).
 Rand, John Clark, One of a Thousand: a Series of Biographical Sketches of One Thousand Representative Men, Boston, Massachusetts First National Publishing Company, Pg. 260, (1890).

External links
 

1831 births
1917 deaths
Mayors of Melrose, Massachusetts
Businesspeople from Massachusetts
People from Melrose, Massachusetts
Members of the Massachusetts House of Representatives
People from Dixmont, Maine
19th-century American politicians
People from Stoneham, Massachusetts
Mayors of places in Massachusetts
19th-century American businesspeople